State Highway 151 (SH 151), also known as the Raymond E. Stotzer Jr. Freeway, is a  state highway in the U.S. state of Texas that runs from Loop 1604 to U.S. Highway 90 (US 90) in San Antonio. SH 151 is a limited-access freeway for its entire length with the exception of its junction with Loop 1604 at its western terminus where a traffic light controls the junction. The routing of the freeway was first conceived in 1983 and construction was conducted in phases through the 1980s and 1990s until completion in 2004. The freeway provides access to the western part of San Antonio, the SeaWorld San Antonio theme park, Chase, Northwest Vista College, and the future site of a Microsoft data center.

History

Previous designation
The first SH 151 was designated on March 19, 1930, from Mason to Menard as a renumbering of SH 29A. On February 11, 1938, SH 151 was extended west to Eldorado. On March 17, 1948, FM 43 became part of SH 151, extending it to Eldorado. On August 22, 1951, SH 151 was cancelled and transferred to SH 29 which was extended.

Planning
The route of SH 151 was originally conceived in 1983 by local land developer Charles Martin Wender and later received approval by Raymond Stotzer, the district supervisor of the Texas Department of Transportation at the time and for whom the freeway would later be named. The freeway was a joint effort with landowners providing 85% of the right-of-way worth US$26 million and half of the cost of the frontage roads worth $14 million with the city buying the rest. During the construction of the freeway, the Texas Turnpike Authority considered SH 151 as a candidate to become a toll road, but this drew much criticism from local politicians and the Bexar County commissioners and did not come to fruition. SH 151 was designated on March 14, 1984, on its current route.

Construction
The freeway was built in phases with the frontage roads constructed first followed by the main lanes. The overpasses for Wiseman Boulevard, Westover Hills Boulevard and Military Drive between I-410 and Loop 1604 were completed over the main lanes of SH 151 in 1987. In 1988, the I-410 overpasses over the SH 151 frontage roads were completed, as was the interchange with US 90 at the eastern terminus. Also completed in 1988 were the frontage road bridges over Leon and Slick Ranch Creek, which enabled traffic to travel the entire corridor from Loop 1604 to US 90 by way of the frontage roads. The main lane overpasses at FM 1957 (Potranco Road) and Ingram Road were completed in 1997. The overpasses at Pinn Road and Historic Old Highway 90 (known as Enrique M. Barrera Parkway from 2015 to 2022) were completed in 1998, and completed at Callaghan Road in 2000. Construction of the freeway was completed in 2004.

Route description
SH 151 begins at Loop 1604, the outer loop around San Antonio, on the west side of San Antonio and from there follows a southeastern path through the western part of the city. The highway provides access to the SeaWorld San Antonio theme park as well as industry along its corridor to include Chase, Hyatt Hill Country Resort, World Savings, Philips semiconductor, the National Security Agency campus, QVC, American Funds, Maxim Integrated Products, and the Northwest Vista College, as well as the nearby Southwest Research Institute. Microsoft has also selected the corridor for a $550 million data center. The highway continues to the southeast to a junction with Interstate 410 (I-410), the inner loop around San Antonio. A new direct, flyover interchange was built connecting eastbound TX-151 with northbound I-410, alleviating traffic at its busiest stretches. A fully directional, stack interchange has been planned, partially funded, and is set to begin construction in 2019. The highway continues to the southeast through mainly undeveloped land until it merges with US 90. According to the San Antonio Master Thoroughfare Plan, there are plans to extend SH 151 westward from Loop 1604 to SH 211. The plan also shows the construction of an interchange at Loop 1604.

Traffic volumes are low to moderate for the entire length of the freeway ranging from 14,500 average annual daily traffic (AADT) just east of Loop 1604 to 46,000 AADT between Farm to Market Road 1957 (FM 1957) and I-410. Between 2003 and 2005, traffic volumes have remained steady between I-410 and US 90. In that same time period, traffic between I-410 and Loop 1604 has increased by 1,100-7,000 AADT.

Exit list

See also

References

151
Transportation in San Antonio
Transportation in Bexar County, Texas
1984 establishments in Texas